Dimethylbenzylamine is the organic compound with the formula C6H5CH2N(CH3)2. The molecule consists of a benzyl group, C6H5CH2, attached to a dimethylamino functional group. It is a colorless liquid.  It is used as a catalyst for the formation of polyurethane foams and epoxy resins.

Synthesis
N,N-Dimethylbenzylamine can be synthesized by the Eschweiler–Clarke reaction of benzylamine

Reactions
It undergoes directed ortho metalation with butyl lithium:

[C6H5CH2N(CH3)2 + BuLi → 2-LiC6H4CH2N(CH3)2
LiC6H4CH2N(CH3)2 + E+ → 2-EC6H4CH2N(CH3)2

Via these reactions, many derivatives are known with the formula 2-X-C6H4CH2N(CH3)2 (E = SR, PR2, etc.).

The amine is basic and undergoes quaternization with alkyl halides (e.g. hexyl bromide) to give quaternary ammonium salts:

[C6H5CH2N(CH3)2 + RX →    [C6H5CH2N(CH3)2R]+X−

Such salts are useful phase transfer catalysts.

References

External links
Safety MSDS data

Alkyl-substituted benzenes
Dimethylamino compounds
Benzyl compounds